St. John River District is one of six districts located in Grand Bassa County, Liberia. The name derives from the Saint John River.

Communities
 Edina

Districts of Liberia
Grand Bassa County